Everywhere and His Nasty Parlour Tricks is a 2001 EP by the alternative rock band Modest Mouse. It collects the earlier Night on the Sun EP along with unreleased tracks from the recording sessions for The Moon & Antarctica.

It was released on Epic Records on September 25, 2001, on both CD and vinyl LP.

Track listing
All lyrics written by Isaac Brock; all music composed by Isaac Brock, Eric Judy, Jeremiah Green, except where noted.
 "Willful Suspension of Disbelief" – 3:38
 "Night on the Sun" – 7:38
 "3 Inch Horses, Two Faced Monsters" (Brock) – 4:13
 "You're the Good Things" – 3:33
 "The Air" – 4:32
 "So Much Beauty in Dirt" – 1:24
 "Here It Comes" – 3:10
 "I Came as a Rat (Long Walk off a Short Dock)" – 4:36

A short excerpt of "3 Inch Horses, Two Faced Monsters" was used as a sample at the end of The Moon & Antarctica's "A Different City".

Personnel
Isaac Brock – banjo, guitar, vocals, producer, engineer, Fender Rhodes, artwork, mixing
Jeremiah Green – percussion, drums
Eric Judy – bass, guitar, keyboards
Ben Massarella – percussion
Tyler Riley – fiddle
Tim Rutili – guitar
Ben Blankenship – bass
Brian Deck – arranger, producer, mixing
Phil Ek – producer
Tom Baker – mastering

Album charts

References

Modest Mouse albums
2001 EPs
Epic Records EPs